is a Japanese manga series written by Robinson Haruhara and illustrated by Hirakei. It started serialization on the Shōnen Jump+ manga website in April 2019. It has been published in ten tankōbon volumes as of October 2022.

Premise
In an ongoing battle between the Imperial Army and the Hellhorde, the princess from the army has been captured along with her holy sword Ex. Since regular torture is prohibited by the prisoner of war treaty between the two parties, the grand inquisitor, Torture Tortura, employs unusual "torture" (in air quotes) techniques, usually in the form of tempting foods and snacks from Japanese culture. The princess relents, but gives information that is usually trivial in nature, and the few times she does give useful information, the Hell-Lord does not take advantage of it.

Characters

Main characters

The commander of the Third Order of the Imperial Army. She is a formidable fighter but is highly susceptible to the "torture" tactics employed by Tortura.

The legendary holy sword that belongs to the princess. They often narrate the story so far.

The Hellhorde's highest-ranking torturer.

Torturers
 and 
Two-horned Youki and one-horned Inki are the "Lieutorments" (intermediate torturers) who report to Tortura. They employ multiplayer video games, allowing the Princess to join in if she relents.

Top combatant and senior torturer, Beastmaster Krall has a number of fierce monsters as well as cute baby animals as pets.

A giantess whom the Princess meets at the hot springs. Her size allows her to coddle the Princess as if she were a baby, pampering information out of her.

The Hell-Lord's young daughter who participates in the "torcher" inquiries.

Hell-Lord

The king of the Hellhorde. He enjoys Japanese culture as well.

Humans

A white knight. He attempts to rescue the Princess, but is a bit creepy.

The Princess's butler and a former knight.

Publication
The series is written by Robinson Haruhara and illustrated by Hirakei. It started serialization on the Shōnen Jump+ manga website on April 4, 2019. The first tankōbon volume was released on September 4, 2019. As of October 2022, ten volumes have been released.

In October 2019, Manga Plus announced they would start publishing the series on their app and website.

Volume list

Reception
In 2020, the series ranked second in the Next Manga Award in the web manga category. Makoto Yukimura, author of Vinland Saga, recommended the series, calling it his "favorite manga these days".

See also
Senyu — Another manga series written by Robinson Haruhara.

References

Works cited 
  "Ch." is shortened form for chapter and refers to a chapter number of the Tis Time for Torture, Princess manga, as published in English by Manga Plus

Other references

External links
Official website at Shōnen Jump+ 
  at Manga Plus

2019 webcomic debuts
Comedy anime and manga
Fantasy anime and manga
Japanese webcomics
Shōnen manga
Shueisha manga
Webcomics in print